José Gilberto Montoya is a researcher and infectious disease doctor.  He was a Professor of Medicine in Infectious Disease at the Stanford University School of Medicine, where he led Stanford's Initiative on Chronic Fatigue Syndrome. He has worked on a wide variety of projects in this field including research focused on the efficacy of new smallpox vaccines. Additionally, he is the founder and co-director of the Immunocompromised Host Service and works at the Positive Care Clinic at Stanford. He is originally from Cali, Colombia.

Biography
Montoya received a medical degree with honors from University of Valle.

He completed his residency in Internal Medicine at Tulane University. Montoya then completed his post-doctoral fellowship at Stanford University.

Research
Montoya specializes in toxoplasmosis and infectious diseases particularly as it pertains to cardiac transplants and AIDS patients. Montoya  is also the recipient of many Stanford teaching awards, including the Bloomfield, Ebaugh, Kaiser and Rytand awards. He is also noted for his research into the use of valganciclovir as a treatment for chronic fatigue syndrome.

2019 firing 
Montoya was terminated from Stanford employment in May 2019. His termination occurred after an investigation, led by an outside attorney and an unnamed Stanford faculty member, found what Singh called "multiple violations of the University’s conduct policies." The investigation was launched in response to "complaints relating to his conduct," according to the email. In June 2019, the Stanford Daily reported that a former member of the Myalgic Encephalomyelitis/Chronic Fatigue Syndrome (ME/CFS) Initiative, which Montoya previously led, stated that "violations of sexual harassment and sexual misconduct" were behind the complaint.

Publications 
He is one of thejoint authors of a very frequently cited practice guidelines: *

 Stevens DL, Bisno AL, Chambers HF, Everett ED, Dellinger P, Goldstein EJ, Gorbach SL, Hirschmann JV, Kaplan EL, Montoya JG, Wade JC. Practice guidelines for the diagnosis and management of skin and soft-tissue infections. Clinical Infectious Diseases. 2005 Nov 15;41(10):1373-406. (cited 1598 times) 
 Stevens DL, Bisno AL, Chambers HF, Dellinger EP, Goldstein EJ, Gorbach SL, Hirschmann JV, Kaplan SL, Montoya JG, Wade JC. Practice guidelines for the diagnosis and management of skin and soft tissue infections: 2014 update by the Infectious Diseases Society of America. Clinical infectious diseases. 2014 Jul 15;59(2):e10-52. (cited 1275  times) 

His other  most cited publications according to Google Scholar are:

 Goldstein EJ, Montoya JG, Remington JS. Management of Toxoplasma gondii infection during pregnancy. Clinical Infectious Diseases. 2008 Aug 15;47(4):554-66. (cited 559 times)
 Montoya JG. Laboratory diagnosis of Toxoplasma gondii infection and toxoplasmosis. The Journal of infectious diseases. 2002 Feb 15;185(Supplement_1):S73-82. (cited 468 times)
 Jones JL, Dargelas V, Roberts J, Press C, Remington JS, Montoya JG. Risk factors for Toxoplasma gondii infection in the United States. Clinical Infectious Diseases. 2009 Sep 15;49(6):878-84.(cited 369 times)
 Remington JS, Thulliez P, Montoya JG. Recent developments for diagnosis of toxoplasmosis. Journal of clinical microbiology. 2004 Mar 1;42(3):941-5.(cited 356 times)

References

Year of birth missing (living people)
Living people
People from Cali
American infectious disease physicians
Tulane University alumni
Stanford University School of Medicine faculty
Stanford University fellows
Colombian emigrants to the United States